William House may refer to:

People
 William John House, British soldier, VC recipient
 William F. House, U.S. doctor, pioneer of cochlear implants
 William Pendleton House, U.S. rock climber, first technical ascent of Devil's Tower National Monument.
 Will House (cricketer), English cricketer
 William House, British miners' leader

Places
 H. B. William House, Sarasota, Florida, listed on the U.S. National Register of Historic Places
 The William Forst House, an historic building in Russellville, Kentucky.
 William House (building), a heritage building in Darlinghurst, New South Wales, Australia

See also
Williams House (disambiguation)